VJ may refer to

Arts and media
 Video jockey, a television announcer who introduces and plays videos
 VJing, a live visual performance art practice
 Vee-Jay Records, an American blues and jazz record label
 Video journalism
 Video joker, a translator and commentator at movie theaters in Uganda
 Viewtiful Joe, a video game series by Capcom

People
 Van Jacobson (born 1950), American computer scientist
 Vickie Johnson (born 1972), American basketball player
 Reginald VelJohnson (born 1952), American actor
 Victoria Justice (born 1993), an American actress, singer, songwriter and dancer.

Science and technology
 V(D)J recombination, a mechanism of genetic recombination
 Visual J Sharp, or Visual J#, a programming language

Other uses
 Victory over Japan Day, V-J Day
 Vojska Jugoslavije, the military of Serbia and Montenegro from 1992 to 2003
 Willys-Overland Jeepster, an automobile produced 1948-1950
 VietJet Air (code VJ)
 VJ Patterson, a fictional character in the Australian television soap opera Home and Away

See also

All pages containing "vj"
VJS (disambiguation)
 Veejay (disambiguation)
 Vijay (disambiguation)
 V (disambiguation)
 J (disambiguation)
 JV (disambiguation)